DiAnne C. Gove (born February 15, 1951) is an American Republican Party politician who serves in the New Jersey General Assembly representing the 9th Legislative District. She was sworn in on December 7, 2009, to fill the vacant seat left by the resignation of fellow Republican Daniel Van Pelt after his arrest on corruption charges. She has been the Minority Policy Co-Chair in the General Assembly since 2014.

Early life 
Gove is the daughter of Anne Christoph and Richard Raymond Gove. She was raised in the Brant Beach section of Long Beach Township and attended Southern Regional High School in Manahawkin. She received a Bachelor of Arts from Cabrini College and later a Master of Arts from Monmouth University, both degrees in social science. Gove spent more than three decades in the faculty at Southern Regional High School, where she taught history and government. She served as mayor of Long Beach Township from 2004-2008 and served three terms as a Long Beach Township Commissioner. Gove served as a commissioner on the Ocean County Utilities Authority.

New Jersey Assembly 
Gove was selected on August 12, 2009, by delegates from the Ocean County, Atlantic County, and Burlington County Republican Committees to fill a vacancy in the General Assembly created by the resignation of Republican Assemblyman Daniel Van Pelt on July 31, 2009. Van Pelt had been arrested as part of Operation Bid Rig by federal agents on July 23, 2009, and charged with accepting a $10,000 bribe from a cooperating witness. At the special convention, all others candidates for the seat formally withdrew their names from contention and endorsed Gove. She served the remainder of Van Pelt's term, which ended in January 2010. She also replaced Van Pelt on the November ballot, running for a term in her own right. Gove stated that "getting the confidence of the people back into government" was an important part of her campaign. She and Assemblyman Brian E. Rumpf won easily in the heavily Republican 9th district. Gove is the first woman to represent the 9th district since Virginia E. Haines resigned from office in 1994 to head the New Jersey Lottery, and the sixth woman to represent the county in the state legislature.

Committees 
Committee assignments for the current session are:
Higher Education
Military and Veterans' Affairs
Aging and Senior Services

District 9 
Each of the 40 districts in the New Jersey Legislature has one representative in the New Jersey Senate and two members in the New Jersey General Assembly.Each of the 40 districts in the New Jersey Legislature has one representative in the New Jersey Senate and two members in the New Jersey General Assembly. Representatives from the 9th District for the 2022—2023 Legislative Session are:
Senator Christopher J. Connors
Assemblywoman DiAnne Gove
Assemblyman Brian E. Rumpf

Electoral history

Assembly

References

External links
Official 9th Legislative District website biography
Assemblywoman DiAnne C. Gove's legislative web page, New Jersey Legislature
New Jersey Legislature financial disclosure forms
2015 2014 2013 2012 2011 2010  2009

1951 births
Living people
Mayors of places in New Jersey
Republican Party members of the New Jersey General Assembly
Politicians from Ocean County, New Jersey
Southern Regional High School alumni
Women mayors of places in New Jersey
Women state legislators in New Jersey
21st-century American politicians
21st-century American women politicians